Lorenzo Feliciati (1732–1799) was an Italian painter, born and active in Siena. Several pictures by this artist are to be found in the churches of Siena and its neighborhood. He painted for the church of San Pellegrino, Siena.

References

1732 births
1779 deaths
18th-century Italian painters
Italian male painters
Painters from Siena
RareNoiseRecords artists
Cuneiform Records artists
18th-century Italian male artists